Jwacheon Station is a railway station of the Donghae Line in Jangan-eup, Gijang County, Busan, South Korea. The station is unrelated to the station of the same name of Busan Metro.

External links

Gijang County
Korail stations
Railway stations in Busan
Railway stations opened in 1934
1934 establishments in Korea